Mjölby Municipality (Mjölby kommun) is a municipality in Östergötland County in southeast Sweden. Its seat is located in the city of Mjölby, with some 13,000 inhabitants.

The present municipality was established in 1971, when the City of Mjölby, the City of Skänninge and the rural municipalities in the vicinity were amalgamated into the new entity. There are about twenty original units within Mjölby Municipality.

Localities
Bjälbo
Hogstad
Mantorp
Mjölby (seat)
Skänninge
Spångsholm
Sya
Väderstad

Education
Mjölby has a school for goldsmiths and a school for engine drivers.

Twin cities
Karmøy kommune, Rogaland, Norway
Hankasalmi, Finland
Häädemeeste, Estonia
Rudkøbing and Slangerup, Denmark

References

External links

Mjölby Municipality - Official site

Municipalities of Östergötland County